Seventh Son is a 2014 American fantasy film  directed by Sergei Bodrov and starring Ben Barnes, Jeff Bridges, Alicia Vikander, Kit Harrington, and Julianne Moore. It is loosely based on the 2004 novel The Spook's Apprentice (titled The Last Apprentice: Revenge of the Witch in the United States) by Joseph Delaney. The story centers on Thomas Ward, a seventh son of a seventh son, and his adventures as the apprentice of the Spook. After having its release date shifted numerous times, the film was released in France on December 17, 2014, and in Canada and the United States on February 6, 2015, by Universal Pictures. Seventh Son received generally negative reviews from film critics and it earned $114 million on a $95 million budget.

Plot
In 1572, the witch Malkin is imprisoned underground by Gregory, the last of the Falcons, a knightly order which defended mankind against supernatural threats. Years later, Gregory works as a "spook" – a roving witch hunter.

Malkin escapes, killing Gregory's apprentice William, and fleeing to her mountain fortress. She restores the fortress and the beauty of her disfigured, loyal sister, Bony Lizzie. The coming centennial blood moon will make Malkin unstoppable.

Gregory seeks out Tom Ward – the seventh son of a seventh son – as his new apprentice. Tom's Mam gives him her necklace as a talisman, urging him to wear it always. In a town, Tom sees a girl, Alice, about to be burned as a witch. Recognizing her from his clairvoyant visions, Tom frees her. Alice requests that he not tell Gregory about her. She is revealed to be Lizzie's daughter, sent to spy on Gregory. Malkin begins gathering an army of minions.

Tom meets Gregory's assistant, Tusk. With only a week before the blood moon is full, reviving Malkin's full power, Tom must rush through his training while the trio head to Malkin's fortress. En route, Gregory is summoned to a walled city by an inquisitor whose forces have subdued one of Malkin's followers, a werebear named Urag. Tom hesitates when instructed to burn the werebear alive, causing Gregory to dismiss him and light the flame himself. Tom meets Alice again; the two share their feelings for each other and fall in love. They briefly consider running off, but Tom has a vision of Malkin killing Gregory and unleashing destruction upon the world. Tom returns to Gregory, who reveals that he once loved Malkin, leading him to imprison rather than kill her. Gregory feels responsible for every person killed by Malkin, and warns Tom never to show mercy to witches.

The trio are attacked on the road by an enormous boggart. Tom kills it and survives being swept down a waterfall. He is confronted by Bony Lizzie, whose attack is repelled by his Mam's necklace. Gregory recognizes it as the Umbran Stone, which increases the power of witches. It had once belonged to Malkin, until one of her witch followers – Tom's Mam – stole it, weakening Malkin enough for Gregory to trap her.

Malkin instructs Alice to steal the stone, promising to spare Tom's life. Malkin and her minions destroy the city where Urag was killed, to avenge his death. By chance, Tom's family is in the city; his Mam kills the warlock Strix and confronts Malkin with her own powers. Malkin kills her, mocking her for giving away the stone that might have saved her life.

Alice finds Tom and pleads with him to leave with her. Gregory tries to kill her, but Tom intervenes, allowing her to flee. Gregory points out she has taken the necklace, and Tom, Gregory and Tusk pursue her. Malkin's servant Radu attacks them; he captures Gregory and drives Tusk and Tom over a cliff, leaving them for dead. Tom wakes to a vision of his Mam telling him that, as both the seventh son of a seventh son, and the son of a witch, he has a unique power to defeat Malkin.

The witches gather as Malkin attempts to seduce Gregory. Alice is horrified when told that Tom is dead, and grabs the stone from Malkin, breaking Malkin's hold on Gregory. Malkin transforms into a dragon, and Lizzie also transforms, to protect her daughter. Tom retrieves the stone and, fighting together, Gregory, Tom and Alice kill several of Malkin's minions. Malkin kills Lizzie, but is seriously wounded. Gregory follows Malkin into her room and confronts her. Appearing close to death, she recalls their relationship, but then seizes Gregory with her claws. Tom enters and hurls a blade at Malkin, making her release her grip. Tom kills Malkin and they burn her body.

Gregory brands Tom's hand, declaring him a Falcon knight. Alice accepts that Tom's vocation means they cannot be together, but promises they will meet again. Gregory leaves for parts unknown, leaving Tom and Tusk to continue his work, but urging Tom not to follow the "rules".

Cast

 Jeff Bridges as Master Gregory
 Ben Barnes as Tom Ward
 Julianne Moore as Mother Malkin
 Alicia Vikander as Alice
 Antje Traue as Bony Lizzie
 Olivia Williams as Mam Ward
 John DeSantis as Tusk
 Kit Harington as William Bradley
 Djimon Hounsou as Radu
 Gerard Plunkett as Inquisitor
 Jason Scott Lee as Urag

Production
Sam Claflin was in negotiations to star as Tom Ward, but in June 2011, negotiations with Claflin fell through and Ben Barnes replaced him. Production began on March 19, 2012, in Vancouver, British Columbia. In February 2013, Legendary Pictures agreed to give $5 million to recently bankrupt visual effects house Rhythm and Hues Studios so they would complete their work on Seventh Son.

By the time production wrapped, the budget had ballooned to as much as $110 million. China Film Group made an "eight-figure" equity investment in the film, as well as the adaptation of Warcraft (2016).

Music
It was originally announced that A. R. Rahman and Tuomas Kantelinen would compose the score for the movie. However, in July 2013, Rahman left the project due to scheduling conflicts. A. R. Rahman revealed that he backed out from the project to compose for Kaaviya Thalaivan, a Tamil historical fiction film, because it gave him the scope to innovate with folk music like never before. Subsequently, in December 2013, Kantelinen was replaced by Marco Beltrami.

Release
The film was originally scheduled for release on February 15, 2013, but was moved back to October 18, 2013, to complete post-production. It was moved again to January 17, 2014, due to the film's production partner Legendary Pictures parting ways with Warner Bros., who were initially intended to distribute the film. On August 15, 2013, it was announced that Legendary had sold the distribution rights to their new partner Universal Studios, which pulled the film again. On November 27, 2013, it was announced that the film was pushed back to February 6, 2015. The film premiered in France on December 17, 2014.

Reception

Box office
Seventh Son grossed $17.2 million in North America and $93.4 million in other territories, for a worldwide total of $114.2 million.

North America
The film featured in the list of "The Riskiest Box Office Bets of 2015" published by screenrant.com. The film posted a gross of $295,000 from the Thursday preview. The film earned an opening day gross of estimated $2,300,000, an estimated $3,000,000 for its second day and $1,801,000 for its third day. The film was a commercial disaster, according to Variety the film has a "projected loss of $85 million",  earning only  $7,101,000 weekend gross, by playing in 2,875 theaters, with a $2,470 per-theater average and ranking #4.

Other territories
The film opened in France and Lebanon on December 21, 2014, a month and a half ahead of its North America release, and earned $1.2 million. The following weekend the film added $18.4 million from 24 new markets where it debuted at #1 in Russia, Romania, Malaysia, Singapore and Thailand. Russia opened with $8.6 million while Spain generated $1.2 million.

Critical response
The site's critical consensus reads, "Seventh Son squanders an excellent cast and some strange storyline ingredients, leaving audiences with one disappointingly dull fantasy adventure." On Metacritic, the film has a score of 30 out of 100 based 32 critics, indicating "generally unfavorable reviews". Audiences polled by CinemaScore gave the film an average grade of "B−" on an A+ to F scale.

Peter Debruge of Variety gave a negative review criticizing the film's tired plot, special effects, lack of chemistry, and of the cast's performances such as that of Bridges' and Moore's, and calling the film an "over-designed" and "under-conceived fantasy epic". The Hollywood Reporters Jordan Mintzer writes that it "takes an A-list crew and cast—including Moore sporting a black feather dress and matching eyeliner—and goes nowhere new with it, investing lots in VFX and locations but not enough in an original story anyone cares about". Los Angeles Times Betsey Sharkey said that the movie would "certainly be a contender" for "the worst movie of the year"; she notes, "For acclaimed Russian director Bodrov, this foray into English-language filmmaking is a rare fail. Bodrov certainly knows his way around epics, as his excellent Oscar-nominated films Mongol and Prisoner of the Mountains attest. Seventh comes as a shock. Virtually every performance falls flat, aided no doubt by the vapid dialogue. And Bridges is saddled with an awful accent he never masters." USA Todays Claudia Puig says, "The 3-D effects are off-putting: Smoke spills out at the audience, and the camera swooshes high and careens over cliffs. It's more dizzying than dazzling. Further mucking up the attempts at magical fantasy is a distracting, bombastic musical score and feeble attempts at humor. Seventh Son is thoroughly ill-conceived, a pale imitation of its more adventurous and breathtaking brethren." The Guardians Jordan Hoffman gave the movie two out of five stars and explained, "While Seventh Son has trace of Saturday afternoon fun, its unoriginal nature gets the better of it... There are flashes where you think Seventh Son is going to be wise enough to put a spin on the standard script, but by the end it just devolves into another loud, messy CGI brawl. How much more ruined masonry can moviegoers take? A lot, it seems, as this genre seems to be in no danger of going away."

The New York Daily News Joe Neumaier was more complimentary of Moore's and Bridges' leading performances. "Saints be praised for whatever strange magic brought Bridges and Moore together for their own little mini–Big Lebowski reunion, whether it was playfulness, paychecks or an open spot on their calendars. Because they save this mediocre medieval fantasy adventure from the ash heap."

References

External links
 
 

2014 films
2014 3D films
2014 fantasy films
American 3D films
American dark fantasy films
2010s English-language films
Films based on British novels
Films shot in Vancouver
American high fantasy films
IMAX films
Sororicide in fiction
Films about witchcraft
Legendary Pictures films
Universal Pictures films
Films with screenplays by Max Borenstein
Films with screenplays by Steven Knight
Films scored by Marco Beltrami
Films directed by Sergei Bodrov
Films produced by Thomas Tull
Films about dragons
Films produced by Basil Iwanyk
Thunder Road Films films
2010s American films